The 2022–23 season is the 104th season in the history of Valencia CF and their 36th consecutive season in the top flight. The club are participating in La Liga, the Copa del Rey and the Supercopa de España.

Players

La Liga squad information

Reserve squad information

Transfers

In

Out

Loan Out

Extension

Pre-season and friendlies

Competitions

Overall record

La Liga

League table

Results summary

Results by round

Matches 
The league fixtures were announced on 23 June 2022.

Copa del Rey

Supercopa de España

Team statistics

Appearances and goals

Disciplinary record

References

Valencia CF seasons
Valencia